Biathlon at the 2013 European Youth Winter Olympic Festival is held from 19 to 22 February 2013 at the Cheile Grădiştei Arena in Fundata, Romania.

Results

Medal table

Men's events

Ladies events

Mixed events

External links
Results 
The Venue at EYOWF 2013 | Photo Gallery
THE VENUE at YouTube
EYOWF 2013 - Presentation Video at YouTube
EYOWF 2013 - Facilities Presentation at YouTube

References 

2013 in biathlon
2013 European Youth Olympic Winter Festival events
2013